

Events
The troubadour Peirol pilgrimaged to Jerusalem.

Births
 Alfonso X of Castile (died 1284), Castilian monarch and writer of Galician-Portuguese lyrics
 Willem van Afflighem (died 1297), Flemish poet and abbot at Sint-Truiden

Deaths
 Henry I of Rodez (born 1175), French troubadour
 Jiang Kui (born 1155), Chinese poet, composer and calligrapher of the Song Dynasty
 Attar Neyshapuri (born 1145), Persian Muslim poet, theoretician of Sufism, and hagiographer

See also

Poetry
 List of years in poetry

13th-century poetry
Poetry